Close Combat: Marines is the first version of the Close Combat universe made specifically for military training purposes.  Forces consist of USMC and OpFor troops.  The game was first released in the September 2004, issue of the Marine Corps Gazette.

A commercial version for civilians was made called The Road to Baghdad.

Reception

References

2004 video games
Propaganda video games
Real-time tactics video games
Video games about the United States Marine Corps
Video games developed in the United States
Windows games
Windows-only games
Multiplayer and single-player video games
Atomic Games games